Ruffner Mountain Nature Preserve is a  nature preserve located in the eastern portion of Jefferson County, Alabama, in the City of Birmingham's historic South East Lake neighborhood. The preserve includes a visitor center containing native Alabama animals including raptors, snakes, turtles, and owls. The Ruffner Mountain area was home to iron ore mines and stone quarries, supplying the area's steel mills.

History
In 1883, William Henry Ruffner, a professor at Roanoke College who had served as Virginia's first superintendent of public instruction and who had trained as geologist at Washington & Lee University, and John L. Campbell completed a survey for the Georgia Pacific Railway from Atlanta to the Mississippi River, including the Birmingham District.

When the mines were finally shut down in the 1950s, nature reclaimed the area. 1977 marked the beginning of the Ruffner Mountain Nature Coalition, a nonprofit that leased 28 acres of land belonging to the City of Birmingham for protection and preservation.

In 2010, construction was completed on RMNC's state-of-the-art LEED certified Treetop Visitor's Center and Education Pavilion. The new  nature center replaced the organization's old administrative office building, visitor's center, and pavilion. The contractor, Stewart Perry, Inc., and architect, KPS Group, designed a building using sustainable architecture and materials ranging from a rainwater collection system to a myriad of recycled building materials and furnishings.

References

External links

An Article about Ruffner Mountain Nature Preserve in the Encyclopedia of Alabama

Geography of Birmingham, Alabama
Historic American Engineering Record in Alabama
Nature centers in Alabama
Nature reserves in Alabama
Parks in Alabama
Parks in Birmingham, Alabama
Protected areas of Jefferson County, Alabama